Cooee Mountain may refer to:
Cooee Mountain (Queensland) in the Glass House Mountains
Cooee Mountain (New South Wales) in the Moonbi Ranges

Great Dividing Range